Hagbarth Dahlman (né Andersen; January 15, 1901 – November 23, 1974) was a Danish field hockey player who competed in the 1928 Summer Olympics.

He was born in Copenhagen and died in Aarhus.

In 1928 he was a member of the Danish team which was eliminated in the first round of the Olympic tournament after two wins and two losses.  He played all four matches as goalkeeper.

External links
 
 profile

1901 births
1974 deaths
Danish male field hockey players
Olympic field hockey players of Denmark
Field hockey players at the 1928 Summer Olympics
Sportspeople from Copenhagen